William Albert Bussing (born September 27, 1933 Los Angeles, California, died 2014 San Jose, Costa Rica), known as Don William, was an American ichthyologist who spent most of his career on the faculty of the Universidad de Costa Rica, working there from 1966 to 1991. He was appointed professor in 1978 and when he retired he became Emeritus professor. His university education was interrupted by his conscription to serve in the Korean War and by other jobs, he graduated with a Bachelor of Arts from the University of Southern California in 1960, and teaching degree in 1961.

Following his graduation he obtained an Inter-American Cultural Convention scholarship and travelled to Costa Rica to carry out research on the ecology of fishes of the Río Puerto Viejo, Sarapiquí in Costa Rica. One result of this research was the description of a new species,  in his first paper published in 1963, the first of over 90 publications. He taught a course in ichthyology at the Universidad de Costa Rica in 1962 and from 1963 and 1965 he worked towards his Masters on the bathypelagic fishes found off the coasts of Peru and Chile. In 1965 he became  an assistant researching fish herbivory around Enewetak Atoll.  He returned to Universidad de Costa Rica in 1966 to teach biology. In 1968 he was a co-founder of the Universidad de Costa Rica's Museo de Zoología.

In 1990 he was appointed by the Food and Agriculture Organization to study the distribution of fishes on the Pacific slope of Mesoamerica and Colombia, this work being published in many FAO guides to the commercially exploited fishes of the region. In all he wrote over 90 papers, a number of books and described around 60 new species. Bussing described more new species of vertebrate than any other zoologist working on Costa Rica.

References

American ichthyologists
1933 births
2014 deaths